The South African Audience Research Foundation (SAARF) is a non-profit organisation which publishes media audience and product/brand research on traditional media.

It was formerly known as the South African Advertising Research Foundation (following a name change in 2012).

It is primarily known for its research surveys AMPS, RAMS and TAMS   in addition to other products such as SAARF Development Index and the SAARF Universal Living Standards Measure (LSMs).

History 
1973 (24 October): Formation of SAARF (South African Advertising Research Foundation) announced.
1974 (4 December): Formally established. 
1975 (January): Operations began.
1975: First research report, SAARF AMPS 1975 (a joint venture with the National Readership Survey).
1985: Casper Venter (first General Manager of SAARF) retires. Gert Yssel (formerly Deputy Director General of the SABC) steps in to fill the position.  
1987: Outdoor was included in AMPS for the first time (was measured again in 1988, 1991 & 1995).
1980s (Mid): MARST (Marketing and Advertising Research and Standards Trust) was conceived, to handle the collection of the levy and distribute to ASA (Advertising Standards Authority) and SAARF.
1990 (31 January): MARST is formed.
1992 (November): MARST is terminated.
1996: A new MD of SAARF is appointed, Mike Gorton, who was tasked with a strategic review of SAARF's budget and future plans.
2000: SAARF increased the scope of its activities after it conducted strategic reviews to find out what the Industry wanted.
2012 (May): SAARF started using IHS Global Insight Regional eXplorer suite of models for their population estimates (previously used Bureau of Market Research of UNISA (BMR)). 
2012 (July): Name changed to "South African Audience Research Foundation".
2013 (June): NAB gives notice of its resignation from SAARF (effective 31 December 2014).
2013 (June): Clare O’Neill (chairman) withdrew from the board after SAARF Annual General Meeting (AGM).

Surveys 
The surveys are done by Nielsen on behalf of SAARF.
 All Media and Products Survey (AMPS): covers the total population of South Africa that is at least 15 years of age (prior to 2009, the survey covered persons 16 years and older). Interviewers with laptops do in-home interviews using Double Screen - Computer Assisted Personal Interviewing (DS-CAPI). The AMPS data is released twice a year, based on 12-month rolling data.
 Radio Audience Measurement Survey (RAMS): At the end of the above mentioned interview, a RAMS diary (containing a list of radio stations in South Africa) is left with the respondent for a week so as to gain radio listenership. The RAMS data is released six times a year, based on period-on-period as well as year-on-year data.
 Television Audience Measurement Survey (TAMS).

AMPS Features

See also
 List of newspapers in South Africa
 List of magazines in South Africa
 List of radio stations in South Africa

References

External links 
 

1974 establishments in South Africa
Organisations based in Johannesburg
Research institutes in South Africa
Education in Johannesburg
Communications and media organizations based in Africa
Communications in South Africa
Market research organizations